Saint-Vaast-en-Auge (literally Saint-Vaast in Auge) is a commune in the Calvados department in the Normandy region in northwestern France.

Population

Personalities
Nicole Ameline, politician, was born here, 1952.

See also
Communes of the Calvados department

References

Communes of Calvados (department)
Calvados communes articles needing translation from French Wikipedia